Southold is a station along the Main Line (Greenport Branch) of the Long Island Rail Road. It is located on Youngs Avenue and Traveler Street, just north of NY 25 (Main Road) in Southold, New York, and is the last LIRR station to be located north of NY 25.

History 
The station opened on July 29, 1844, and then was rebuilt between November 1869 and January 1870. The station was closed again in 1958, and then burned down in June 1962. When Peconic station closed sometime in 1970, Southold station became the nearest replacement. A high-level platform was added during the 1990s.

Station layout
This station has one high-level side platform south of the tracks that is long enough for one and a half cars to receive and discharge passengers. The Main Line has two tracks at this location, one is a siding.

References

External links 

Unofficial LIRR History Website
1870 Southold Station (Photo from 1958)
Current sheltered platforms
Unofficial LIRR Photography Site (lirrpics.com)
Southold Station
Station entrance from Google Maps Street View

Long Island Rail Road stations in Suffolk County, New York
Southold, New York
Railway stations in the United States opened in 1844
1844 establishments in New York (state)